Saphenista delapsa is a species of moth of the family Tortricidae. It is found in Guerrero, Mexico.

References

Moths described in 1990
Saphenista